Oxford Rugby Football Club is a rugby union club based in Oxford. The club was founded in 1909 as "Oxfordshire Nomads RUFC".

History
The club was established in 1909 as "Oxfordshire Nomads RUFC". The club wound up in 1919 after 18 members were killed in the World War I, but Oxfordshire recovered and were back to field two years later. The club changed to "Oxford RFC" after a merger in 1948, and moved to Southern Bypass, in 1951.

During the seventies the club were known as Oxford City RFC and competed in the 1971–72 John Player Cup which today is known as the Anglo-Welsh Cup. Their most famous player was arguably Michael James Parsons known as Jim Parsons who was capped by England four times in the 1968 Five Nations Championship , after joining Northampton Saints.
In the 1988–89 Pilkington Cup they did well to progress to the third round but were then drawn away to four time winners and England's leading club at the time Bath, which resulted in an 82-9 hammering.

Current situation
The club runs 2 Senior teams, a Colts.  The 1st XV currently play in the Berks, Bucks and Oxon 2 North after demotion from BBO Premiership in the 2019/2020 season. This level 8 team play their home games at North Hinksey Park in North Hinksey Village. The club colours are Green, Black & Silver Hoops.

Honors
Oxfordshire RFU County Cup winners (11): 1971, 1973, 1975, 1978, 1980, 1981, 1982, 1986, 1987, 1988, 1989
Bucks/Oxon 1 champions: 2000–01
 Southern Counties Cup Winners 2017–18
 Berks/Bucks & Oxon 2 North Champions: 2021 - 2022

References

External links
 

English rugby union teams
Sport in Oxford
Rugby union in Oxfordshire